Michael Oaten (born 20 August 1961) is  a former Australian rules footballer who played with South Melbourne/Sydney in the Victorian Football League (VFL). 		
	
Oaten's father Max also played for South Melbourne.

Notes

External links 		
		
		
		
		
		
		
Living people		
1961 births		
		
Australian rules footballers from Victoria (Australia)		
Sydney Swans players
Ormond Amateur Football Club players